An ectopic tooth is a tooth that is not located at the dental arch caused by a faulty course during eruption. 
  

Ectopic teeth may commonly occur within the dentate region of the jaws.  Rarely, the ectopic eruption may occur into the non dentate region, such as the coronoid process, mandibular condyle, maxillary sinus, nasal septum and the palate.

References

Developmental tooth disorders